Joaquim "Quino" Colom Barrufet (born November 1, 1988) is a Spanish-Andorran professional basketball player for Bàsquet Girona of the Spain Liga ACB.

Professional career
Colom played in the youth age categories with BC Andorra. He then played with Lleida Bàsquet, in the Spanish minor leagues, from 2003 to 2006. He made his debut with CAI Zaragoza in the 2006–07 season, and then played with CB L'Hospitalet in the 2007–08 season. He spent the 2008–09 season back with Lleida Bàsquet and had another brief stay with CAI Zaragoza in 2009.

On 8 July 2009, he signed with Fuenlabrada. On 31 July 2013, he parted with Fuenlabrada. Two days later, he signed a one-year deal with Estudiantes. On 20 August 2014, he signed a one-year deal with Bilbao Basket.

On 11 July 2015, he signed a one-year deal with UNICS Kazan of the VTB United League. On 18 May 2016, he was named the VTB United League 2015–16 season's VTB United League Sixth Man of the Year. On 12 June 2016, he re-signed with UNICS for two more seasons.

On July 14, 2019, Colom signed a two-year deal with Spanish club Valencia Basket. On 16 December 2020, he parted ways with Valencia and signed for Serbian club Crvena zvezda of the ABA League. He finished the 2020-21 season off by playing for Saski Baskonia. 

On August 20, 2021, Colom signed with AEK Athens of the Greek Basket League and the Basketball Champions League. In 26 league games, he averaged 13 points, 3.6 rebounds, 6.3 assists and 0.5 steals, playing around 31 minutes per contest. On July 10, 2022, Colom parted ways with the Greek club.

On July 11, 2022, Colom signed with Bàsquet Girona of the Spain Liga ACB.

National team career
After playing an Under-16 Championship with Andorra in 2004, where he won the gold medal, Colom joined the junior national teams of Spain. With Spain's junior national teams, he played at the 2006 FIBA Europe Under-18 Championship, where he won a bronze medal, and at the 2007 FIBA Under-19 World Championship.

He also played at the 2008 FIBA Europe Under-20 Championship, where he was voted to the All-Tournament Team, and where he won a bronze medal.

Thanks to his good performances during the 2014–15 season with Bilbao Basket, Colom was pre-selected to play with the senior Spain national team during their preparation phase for the EuroBasket 2015. However, he did not make the team's final 12 man roster that competed at the actual tournament.

Colom was part of the gold medal-winning Spanish squad for the 2019 FIBA World Cup in China.

References

External links
Twitter
ACB.com Profile  
Eurobasket.com Profile
Euroleague.net Profile
Draftexpress.com Profile 
FIBA Game Center Profile
FIBA Archive Profile

1988 births
Living people
2019 FIBA Basketball World Cup players
ABA League players
AEK B.C. players
Andorran men's basketball players
Bahçeşehir Koleji S.K. players
Baloncesto Fuenlabrada players
Basket Zaragoza players
Bàsquet Girona players
BC UNICS players
Bilbao Basket players
CB Estudiantes players
CB L'Hospitalet players
FIBA Basketball World Cup-winning players
KK Crvena zvezda players
Liga ACB players
Point guards
Saski Baskonia players
Spanish expatriate basketball people in Serbia
Spanish expatriate basketball people in Turkey
Spanish men's basketball players
Valencia Basket players